Ocean Reef Road is an arterial east-west road in Perth, Western Australia. It is located within the northern suburbs of Perth, from Ocean Reef in the west, to Landsdale in the east, with a portion travelling northwards along the coast to Iluka.

History
Up until the mid-1970s the road from Wanneroo Road was named Mullaloo Drive between Wanneroo Road and Craigie Drive/Coyle Road. Mullaloo Drive took the course and road names of today from Wanneroo Road (at Villa Nova) along Mangano Place, Backshall Place, Ocean Reef Road up to Wildlife Place, continuing over the current Mitchell Freeway into Coyle Road, Craigie Drive, Kallaroo Place and then Mullaloo Drive joining Oceanside Promenade at Mullaloo.

Ocean Reef Road between Backshall Place and Wanneroo Road took at slightly different course south, from the original Mullaloo Drive. Then as the suburb of Ocean Reef was built in the 1980s and the Ocean Reef marina were built, Ocean Reef Road was extended this far. During the 1980s the Joondalup Drive intersection was opened. Ocean Reef Road was the northern terminus of the Mitchell Freeway for eleven years from 1988 to 1999.

In the 1990s at the Wanneroo Road end, the road was extended to Hartman Drive near Wangara. The Mitchell Freeway terminated here in the early 1990s. After 1996 Ocean Reef Road was joined to Hodges Drive. In 2006 Ocean Reef Road was extended along the coast from Hodges Drive to Shenton Avenue.

The works to duplicate Ocean Reef Road between Wanneroo Road and Hartman Drive into a dual-carriageway road was to be completed in May 2008.

As part of the Federal Government's AusLink Strategic Regional Program, Ocean Reef Road was extended east to Alexander Drive. This work was carried out in two stages. First, from Hartman Drive to Prestige Parade (completed March 2009), and secondly, from Prestige Parade to Alexander Drive (commenced in April 2011 and was scheduled to be completed in February 2012). The construction of this stage also affected the alignment and layout of Gnangara Road, as the former section of Gnangara Road from Coverwood Promenade to Alexander Drive now forms part of Ocean Reef Road. Gnangara Road's western section now terminates at Mirrabooka Avenue (formerly Madeley Street), with the remaining section retained as part of the local road network.

Between 2019 and 2020 works were conducted to convert Ocean Reef Road’s intersection with Wanneroo Road to a grade separated interchange, which involves Wanneroo Road free-flowing over traffic light controlled intersections at Ocean Reef Road.

Route description
Ocean Reef Road commences at the intersection of the southern and eastern legs of Gnangara Road and Sydney Road in Landsdale, with Ocean Reef Road continuous with the eastern leg of Gnangara Road, and terminates at the roundabout with Shenton Avenue in Ocean Reef, continuing northwards as Burns Beach Road. The road is a four-lane dual carriageway for almost its entire length, with the exception of the northwards parts running parallel with the coast, where the road is a two-lane single carriageway between Swanson Way and Hodges Drive, though it widens to a two-lane divided carriageway for the remainder of its length. The entire length of the road forms part of State Route 84, along with the eastern section of Gnangara Road.

City of Wanneroo 
Ocean Reef Road commences at a traffic light intersection with the southern and eastern legs of Gnangara Road and Sydney Road. Ocean Reef Road is continuous with the eastern leg of Gnangara Road, while Sydney Road is continuous with the southern leg of Gnangara Road, which also leads to Mirrabooka Avenue. At Ocean Reef Road’s interchange with Wanneroo Road, Wanneroo Road is free-flowing over traffic light controlled intersections at Ocean Reef Road.

Ocean Reef Road then travels through the suburbs of Woodvale and Wanneroo, as well as the Yellagonga Regional Park reserve for  up until the southern part Lake Joondalup, where the road transfers into the City of Joondalup local government area.

City of Joondalup 
Ocean Reef Road, now within the City of Joondalup, continues to border Woodvale to the south but now borders Edgewater to the north. The road intersects with Trappers Drive and Edgewater Drive (the former of which is signalised), encountering a traffic light controlled T-junction with Joondalup Drive  from the City of Joondalup and Wanneroo boundaries. Only another  later takes the road to the Mitchell Freeway at a standard diamond interchange.

Following the freeway interchange, Ocean Reef Road is now bordering both Beldon and Heathridge, intersecting with local roads such as Eddystone Drive and Craigie Drive, bringing the road to Marmion Avenue after . The road then runs through Mullaloo and Ocean Reef for  before encountering a roundabout with Northshore Drive, at the northern terminus of Tourist Drive 204. Following this, Ocean Reef Road curves northwards and, now within the suburb of Ocean Reef, also starts to run parallel with the coastline. After  the road promptly reduces to a two-lane single carriageway at Swanson Way, though the carriageways separate at Hodges Drive another  later. Between the two roads there is an entrance to the Ocean Reef Boat Harbour. The road continues to run parallel to the coastline as a two-lane divided carriageway through Ocean Reef for about  before terminating at Shelton Avenue at Iluka. Ocean Reef Road continues northwards as Burns Beach Road and State Route 87 from this point.

Major intersections

 Shenton Avenue east /  Burns Beach Road (State Route 87) north, Ocean Reef and Iluka
 Hodges Drive, Ocean Reef
  Oceanside Promenade (Tourist Drive 204), Ocean Reef and Mullaloo
  Marmion Avenue (State Route 71), Ocean Reef, Mullaloo, Heathridge and Beldon
 Eddystone Avenue, Heathridge and Beldon
 Craigie Drive, Beldon
  Mitchell Freeway (State Route 2), - Heathridge, Beldon, Edgewater and Woodvale
  Joondalup Drive (State Route 85), Edgewater
 Edgewater Drive, Edgewater
 Trappers Drive, Woodvale
  Wanneroo Road (State Route 60), Wanneroo, Woodvale, Pearsall and Wangara
 Hartman Drive south / Lenore Road north, Wangara and Pearsall
  Gnangara Road (State Route 83 southwest / State Route 84 southeast) / Sydney Road northeast, Gnangara and Landsdale – southwest to Mirrabooka Avenue / southeast to

See also

References

Roads in Perth, Western Australia